Prince Kashemsanta Sobhaga, the Prince Phromwaranurak (18 August 1856 – 4 January 1924) was a Prince of Siam (later Thailand a member of Siamese royal family and a member House of Kashemsanta is a son of King Mongkut of Siam.

His mother was Chao Chom Manda Pae Dharmasaroja is a daughter of Phra Samranharuethai (Uan Dharmasaroja) and Thao Songkandan (Si Dharmasaroja) he had 4 siblings, 2 elder sisters, 1 younger brother and 1 younger sister

 Princess Yingyaovalaksana Akkararajasuda (later Mom Ying)
 Princess Bhaktra Bimalabarna
 Prince Manusyanagamanop
 Princess Banchob Benchama

Prince Kashemsanta Sobhaga died 4 January 1924 at the age 67.

Ancestry

References 

1856 births
1924 deaths
Chakri dynasty
Thai male Phra Ong Chao
Children of Mongkut
People from Bangkok
19th-century Thai people
Members of the Privy Council of Thailand
19th-century Chakri dynasty
20th-century Chakri dynasty
Sons of kings